Laurie Hill (18 July 1942 – 22 May 2014) was an Australian rules footballer who played for Collingwood in the Victorian Football League (VFL) during the 1960s.

A half back flanker, Hill played in losing grand finals for Collingwood in 1964 and 1966. He represented the Victorian interstate side in 1964 and 1965 and finished equal eighth in the 1964 Brownlow Medal.

After playing the opening game of the 1969 VFL season he was dropped to the seconds. Angered by the decision, he left Collingwood and joined Preston (now known as the Northern Blues) in the Victorian Football Association. In five seasons at the club he won two J. J. Liston Trophies, in 1969 and 1971. He was also a dual best and fairest winner and a premiership player in 1969. The club's best and fairest award is named for Hill.

References

Links

 

1942 births
2014 deaths
Australian rules footballers from Victoria (Australia)
Collingwood Football Club players
J. J. Liston Trophy winners
Preston Football Club (VFA) players